Hugo Lapalus (born 9 July 1998) is a French cross-country skier.

Cross-country skiing results
All results are sourced from the International Ski Federation (FIS).

Olympic Games
 1 medal (1 bronze)

Distance reduced to 30 km due to weather conditions.

World Championships
1 medal – (1 bronze)

World Cup

Season titles
 2 titles – (2 U23)

Season standings

References

External links

1998 births
Living people
French male cross-country skiers
FIS Nordic World Ski Championships medalists in cross-country skiing
Sportspeople from Annecy
Cross-country skiers at the 2022 Winter Olympics
Olympic cross-country skiers of France
Medalists at the 2022 Winter Olympics
Olympic bronze medalists for France
Olympic medalists in cross-country skiing
20th-century French people
21st-century French people